Mümmelmannsberg is the eastern terminus station on the Hamburg U-Bahn line U2 in Mümmelmannsberg. The underground rapid transit station was opened in 1990 and is located in the Hamburg suburb of Billstedt, Germany. Billstedt is part of the borough of Hamburg-Mitte.

History 
Like neighboring Steinfurther Allee station, Mümmelmannsberg station was built between 1987 and 1990. The station was designed by Hamburg architects Timm Ohrt & Hille von Seggern; the walls are partially equipped with 1980s style mirror tiles.

Layout 
Mümmelmannsberg station is located underneath Kandinskyallee amidst the 1960s built Mümmelmannsberg housing estate. It has entrances on either end of the platform, both with spacious mezzanine levels, opening up to the lower platform level. The station can be used as a multi-purpose building.

Service

Trains 
Mümmelmannsberg is served by Hamburg U-Bahn line U2; departures are every 10 minutes.

Gallery

See also 

 List of Hamburg U-Bahn stations

References

External links 

 Line and route network plans by hvv.de 
 100 Jahre Hochbahn by hochbahn.de 

Hamburg U-Bahn stations in Hamburg
U2 (Hamburg U-Bahn) stations
Buildings and structures in Hamburg-Mitte
Railway stations in Germany opened in 1990
1990 establishments in West Germany